The Virtus et Fraternitas Medal (Medal Virtus et Fraternitas) was established on 9 November 2017.

It is awarded by the President of Poland on recommendation of the director of the Pilecki Institute as a token of commemoration and gratitude to those who provided aid and assistance to Polish citizens. It is also bestowed to honor individuals who voluntarily keep alive the memory of those who did not survive the war or the forced deportations, and found their graves abroad.

The medal has been conceptually compared to Yad Vashem's Righteous Among the Nations Awards.

Recipients

The medal was awarded for the first time on 19 June 2019. Among the awarded were:

 Tassybay Abdikarimov
 Oleksandra Vaseyko
 Chaim Eiss
 Zinaida Giergiel
 Anatolij Giergiel
 Władysław Konopczyński
 Juliusz Kühl
 Aleksander Ładoś
 Władysława Nagórka
 Antoni Nagórka
 Konstanty Rokicki
 Stefan Ryniewicz
 Adolf Henryk Silberschein
 Lóránd Utassy
The second awarding of medals took place on June 2, 2021 at the Presidential Palace in Warsaw. They were given to the following persons:

 Maria Bazeluk
 Petro Bazeluk
 Ecaterina Caradja
 Petro Hrudzewycz
 Jenő Etter
 Anna Jelínková
 Jan Jelínek
 Jozef Lach
 Žofia Lachová

Design 
The medal is round and silver. On the obsverse it is inscribed "VIRTUS ET FRATERNITATIS" (virtue and brotherhood). In the center of the medal carved stylized image of the White Eagle. The cross is 36 mm in diameter.

The Virtus et Fraternitas Medal is suspended from a purple ribbon, 36 mm wide. Symmetrically arranged along the edges of the ribbon are gold stripes each 4 mm wide, both 4 mm from the edge.

References

See also 

 Pilecki Institute

Orders, decorations, and medals of Poland
Awards established in 2017